is a Japanese badminton player. Born in Hokkaido, she graduated from Shiritsu Towanomorisanai High School. She was part of the Hokuto Bank team. Matsumoto was awarded as the 2018 Most Improved Player of the Year by the BWF together with her partner Wakana Nagahara. They obtained the honor after their win in the 2018 BWF World Championships title and improving their ranking from 14 to 3 in the world. In 30 April 2019, she reached a career high as a women's doubles world No. 1.

Career

2021 
In March, Matsumoto and her partner Wakana Nagahara won their first World Tour Super 1000 title in the All England Open defeating their compatriots, the defending champion, and current world number 1, Yuki Fukushima and Sayaka Hirota in the final. She competed at the 2020 Summer Olympics partnering Nagahara as 3rd seeds, and her pace was stopped by Kim So-yeong and Kong Hee-yong of South Korea in the quarter-finals.

Achievements

BWF World Championships 
Women's doubles

Asian Championships 
Women's doubles

BWF World Tour (4 titles, 9 runners-up) 
The BWF World Tour, which was announced on 19 March 2017 and implemented in 2018, is a series of elite badminton tournaments sanctioned by the Badminton World Federation (BWF). The BWF World Tour is divided into levels of World Tour Finals, Super 1000, Super 750, Super 500, Super 300 (part of the HSBC World Tour), and the BWF Tour Super 100.

Women's doubles

BWF Grand Prix (1 title, 5 runners-up) 
The BWF Grand Prix had two levels, the Grand Prix and Grand Prix Gold. It was a series of badminton tournaments sanctioned by the Badminton World Federation (BWF) and played between 2007 and 2017.

Women's singles

Women's doubles

  BWF Grand Prix Gold tournament
  BWF Grand Prix tournament

BWF International Challenge/Series (2 titles) 
Women's singles

Women's doubles

  BWF International Challenge tournament
  BWF International Series tournament

Performance timeline

National team 
 Junior level

 Senior level

Individual competitions

Senior level

Women's doubles

Mixed doubles

References

External links 
 
 

1995 births
Living people
Sportspeople from Sapporo
Japanese female badminton players
World No. 1 badminton players
Badminton players at the 2020 Summer Olympics
Olympic badminton players of Japan